Eduardo "Gasparín" Acevedo Pineda (born 8 June 1964) is a Guatemalan football manager and retired  football defender.

He is currently in charge of Guatemalan second division side Deportivo Coatepeque.

Club career
Acevedo played the majority of his professional career at Guatemalan club CSD Comunicaciones, where he went on to become the team captain and earn the nickname "Gasparín", same as the club's mascot and in reference to his loyalty for the club. Later on, however, he became a member of Comunicaciones' arch-rivals C.S.D. Municipal and also had a tenure at Antigua GFC.

International career
He made his debut for Guatemala in a May 1991 UNCAF Nations Cup match against El Salvador and has earned a total of 23 caps, scoring no goals. He has represented his country in 4 FIFA World Cup qualification matches and was a squad member at the 1991 UNCAF Nations Cup as well as at the 1991, 1996 and 2000 CONCACAF Gold Cups.

His final international was a May 2000 FIFA World Cup qualification match against El Salvador.

Managerial career
After his playing career Acevedo embarked on a coaching career and worked at Comunicaciones as understudy to Iván León. They were dismissed in 2008. He left Deportivo Iztapa in summer 2010 to manage Deportivo Coatepeque for the 2010/2011 season.

References

External links

1964 births
Living people
Guatemalan footballers
Guatemala international footballers
1991 CONCACAF Gold Cup players
1996 CONCACAF Gold Cup players
2000 CONCACAF Gold Cup players
Comunicaciones F.C. players
C.S.D. Municipal players
Guatemalan football managers
Antigua GFC players

Association football defenders